Les Bolstad Golf Course is a golf course owned by the University of Minnesota. The course is located in Falcon Heights, Minnesota on the "St. Paul" campus of the University. The school's cross country teams use it to hold meets, including the Roy Griak Invitational.

The school's golf teams now hold matches off campus in Blaine, Minnesota at the TPC Twin Cities (Tournament Players Club of the Twin Cities).

References

External links
University of Minnesota's Les Bolstad Golf Course

Buildings and structures in Ramsey County, Minnesota
College golf clubs and courses in the United States
Golf clubs and courses in Minnesota
Minnesota Golden Gophers sports venues
Sports venues in Minneapolis–Saint Paul
1929 establishments in Minnesota